Agostino Rizzo (born 24 March 1999) is an italian professional footballer who plays as a midfielder for  club Avellino.

Career statistics

Club

References

External links 
 
 
 

1999 births
Living people
Footballers from Palermo
Italian footballers
Association football midfielders
Serie B players
Serie C players
Torino F.C. players
Palermo F.C. players
U.S. Livorno 1915 players
U.S. Avellino 1912 players